Faculdade de Medicina de Ribeirão Preto (Ribeirão Preto Medical School in Portuguese) is a medical school of the University of São Paulo (USP) located in the city of Ribeirão Preto, state of São Paulo, Brazil, founded in 1952. It is considered one of the three best medical schools in the country and a premier medical research center.

It has a central building with the main departments for the basic medical sciences and an adjoining University Hospital, with  847 beds. In 2003, the hospital provided in-patient care to 33,973 persons and out-patient (ambulatory) care to approximately 588,000. All medical care is provided free of charge.

History

The Ribeirão Preto Medical School was the third founded in the state of São Paulo and the first outside the capital. In 1951, the state government supported the creation of the school as a way of promoting a better coverage of physicians to the rapidly growing cities in its hinterland. A committee was formed in the University of São Paulo to study and to propose the new school. A professor from the University, physician and parasitologist Dr. Zeferino Vaz was nominated as its chairman and later became the Faculty's first dean, remaining until 1964. With great foresight, and against many resistances of the traditional medical academic establishment, he advocated a modern, research-based school, with all professors with full-time dedication. This was unheard of at that time in Brazil: in this Vaz was trying to follow the most successful American medical schools, such as Johns Hopkins Medical School. Lacking the researchers and professors with the mentality and experience he needed, he resorted to inviting them from Europe and United States.

The school campus was established in a beautiful wooded area in the outskirts of Ribeirão Preto, which was formerly the seat of a state technical agricultural school, and before that, a coffee farm. In the beginning, since the city still lacked adequate resources for housing the professors, several houses in a Mediterranean style were built and furnished for free, thus compensating for the relatively small salaries that were paid to them at that time.

By means of such drive to excellence, soon the School of Medicine of Ribeirão Preto achieved prominence and a unique status in Brazil.

In 2013, it, along with the São Paulo Research Foundation, made plans to begin testing an HIV vaccine, HIVBr18, in monkeys.

Departments
 Cellular and Molecular Biology and Pathogenic Bioagents
 Biomechanics Medicine and Rehabilitation of the Locomotor Apparatus
 Biochemistry and Immunology
 Surgery and Anatomy
 Internal medicine
 Pharmacology
 Physiology
 Genetics
 Gynecology and Obstetrics
 Social medicine
 Neurosciences and Behavioral Sciences
 Psychiatry and Medical psychology
 Ophthalmology
 Otorhinolaryngology and Head and Neck Surgery
 Pathology and Pediatrics

Centers and Associations
 CEMEL - Death Verification Service (Medico-legal service, Morgue)
 CSE - School Health Center which includes 5 Family Care Units; Pedreira de Freitas Community Center, in Cássia dos Coqueiros, Vila Lobato Community Center, in Ribeirão Preto;
 Hemocenter (Hematology)
 CAEP - Educational and Psychological Support Center
 Centro Acadêmico Rocha Lima (Student Union)
 Alumni Association

Figures
The School has 273 faculty (48 at full professor, 78 at adjunct professor and 144 at assistant professor levels), and a clerical and technical staff of 448. All faculty has full-time dedication and is research oriented.  531 papers were published in peer-reviewed international journals in 2003, and 932 in peer-reviewed national journals.

Undergraduate education has 6 years of medical education, with a 2003 enrollment of 806. Degrees were granted till 2003, being 3699 in Medicine, and 236 in Biological Sciences, Medical Modality.

Postgraduate education covers 17 areas, granting master and doctoral degrees. The enrollment in 2003 was of 1221 students, of which 677 at the master's level and 544 at doctoral level. It is one of the largest such programs in Latin America. Until 2003, 2060 master degrees and 1360 doctoral degrees were conferred, with a grand total of 3420. It is also one of the best, with 9 areas with a rating between 5 (good) and 7 (excellent) by the Ministry of Education.

The medical residency program had 28 programs and 504 physicians.

Notable professors

The Ribeirão Preto Medical School has had a number of important Brazilian scientists and physicians, who contributed a great share to the development of science and technology in Brazil:

 Miguel Rolando Covian, professor of Physiology
 Eduardo Krieger, professor of cardiovascular physiology, former president of the Brazilian Academy of Sciences
 Maurício Rocha e Silva, professor of Pharmacology, discoverer of bradykinin
 Sérgio Henrique Ferreira, professor of Pharmacology, discoverer of the Bradykinin Potentiating Factor
 Warwick Estevam Kerr, professor of Genetics
 Lucien Lison, professor of Morphology and one of the founders of histochemistry
 Fritz Köberle, professor of Pathology, proponent of the neurogenic theory of the chronic phase of Chagas disease
 Hélio Lourenço de Oliveira, professor of Internal medicine, who was also a Dean of the University of São Paulo
 Renato Migliorini, professor of physiology
 José Lima Pedreira de Freitas, professor of preventive medicine, epidemiologist and sanitarist, famous for his studies of Chagas disease
 José Moura Gonçalves, professor of Biochemistry, discoverer of the protein structure of Bothrops venom
 Maria Carmelo Lico, professor of Physiology

Notable alumni

 Antonio Palocci, politician, former mayor of Ribeirão Preto, former Minister of Economy
 Sócrates, former star footballer and Brazilian national captain
 Marco Antonio Zago, hematologist, current president of the Brazilian Research Council
 Gilberto de Nucci, pharmacologist
 Renato M.E. Sabbatini, neuroscientist, writer and publisher

Gallery

See also
 List of medical schools

External links
 Home page of the Faculty of Medicine

Research institutes in Brazil
Medical schools in Brazil
University of São Paulo